This is an incomplete list of ghost towns in Kentucky.

 Barthell
 Bells Mines
 Blue Heron
 Bon Jellico
 Burgess Railroad Station
 Creelsboro
 Fords Ferry 
 Fudge
 Golden Pond
 Hilltop
 Jonkan
 Kyrock
 Neal
 Notch Lick
 Packard
 Paradise
 Scuffletown
 Sugartit

Notes and references

 
Kentucky
Ghost towns